The 2016 Eastern Asian Women's Volleyball Championship was the 10th edition of the AVC Eastern Zonal Women's Volleyball Championship, the volleyball championship of East Asia. It was held in Zhangjiagang, China from 19 to 24 July 2016. 

Chinese Taipei won their third title, defeating Japan in the final, 3–1. Wu Weihua was elected the most valuable player.

Pools composition

Preliminary round
 All times are China standard time (UTC+08:00).

Pool A

|}

|}

Pool B

|}

|}

Final round
 All times are China standard time (UTC+08:00).

5th–8th places

5th–8th semifinals

|}

7th place match

|}

5th place match

|}

Final four

Semifinals

|}

3rd place match

|}

Final

|}

Final standing

Awards
MVP:  Wu Weihua
Best Coach:  Lin Minghui

References

External links
 Competitive information

East Asia Volleyball Championship
2016 in Chinese women's sport
2016 in women's volleyball
International volleyball competitions hosted by China